The Cook Islands national rugby league team have represented the Cook Islands in international rugby league football since 1986. Administered by the Cook Islands Rugby League Association (CIRLA), the team has competed at two Rugby League World Cups, in 2000 and 2013, and are coached by Tony Iro.

History

1990s
Before 1995, the Cooks’ international experience was limited to participation in the Pacific Cup, and hosting the touring British Amateur Rugby League Association Great Britain Amateur teams. Nonetheless, the sizeable number of expatriate Cook Islanders living and playing in New Zealand has ensured that they have never been short of players with rugby league experience.

They won the 1995 Emerging Nations tournament, defeating United States, Russia and Scotland before beating Ireland in the final.

In 1996 and 1997 the Cook Islands competed in the Super League World Nines. They also played several full internationals against other South Pacific nations, most notably as part of the Papua New Guinea 50th Anniversary Tournament in October 1998. 2000 saw the Cook Islands competing in the World Cup for the first time. They finished third in their pool after losing to Wales and the Kiwis and only managing a draw against Lebanon.

2000s
The Cook Islands successfully toured New Zealand in 2005 with a three test series against the New Zealand Māori ending in a draw after the first test was drawn 26–26 and the second and third tests were split between both sides.

The Cook Islands played Fiji, Tonga and Samoa in the Pacific pool of Qualifying for the 2008 Rugby League World Cup. Fiji and Tonga qualified, and Samoa earned a second chance in the repecharge round. The Cook Islands, having lost to all three teams, were eliminated.

The Cook Islands participated in the 2009 Pacific Cup. Having beaten Samoa to earn a place in the tournament, they went on to defeat favourites Fiji and earn a place in the final of the competition.

2010s
The Cook Islands were given automatic entry into the 2013 Rugby League World Cup they were placed in Pool D alongside Wales and the United States before playing an Inter-Group match against Tonga. Going into the Tournament, 'the Kukis' had never won a World Cup match. The team lost to the USA and to Tonga, but they won their last match against the Tournament co-hosts Wales, making history for the sport of rugby league in the Cook Islands. This is the Cook Islands' best Rugby League World Cup result to date.

In October 2015 the Cook Islands took on Tonga in the Asia-Pacific elimination play-off to determine which of the two Asia-Pacific nations would qualify for the 2017 Rugby League World Cup. After a tight first half, the Tongans would go on win the match scoring 16 points within the last 20 minutes of the game.

In June 2019, Cook Islands took on South Africa at Ringrose Park in Wentworthville, winning 66–6. They then went on to play the United States at Hodges Stadium in Jacksonville in November. They won 38–16, qualifying them into the 2021 Rugby League World Cup.
At the 2021 Rugby League World Cup, the Cook Islands narrowly beat part timers Wales 18-12 before losing their second group stage match against Papua New Guinea. In their final group stage match, the Cook Islands suffered their worst ever defeat as they were beaten 92-10 by Tonga at the Riverside Stadium.

Players

Current squad
The Cook Islands national team squad for the 2021 Rugby League World Cup

Tournament history

Rugby League World Cup

Other competitions
The Cook Islands have also participated in:
 Pacific Cup (since 1986)
 Super League World Nines (1996, 1997)
 Super League Oceania Tournament (1997)
 Papua New Guinea 50th Anniversary Tournament (1998) 
 Pacific Rim Competition (2004)

Results and fixtures
Below is table of the representative rugby matches played by a Cook Islands national XIII at test level up until 18 December 2020.

Recent Results
Below are the previous 5 matches of the national team. For all past match results, see the team's results page.

See also

 Rugby league in the Cook Islands

References

External links
 Google-Video
 

 
Pacific Rugby League International